The Hoher Kasten is a mountain in the Appenzell Alps, overlooking the Rhine in Eastern Switzerland. It is located on the border between the cantons of Appenzell Innerrhoden and St. Gallen.

The summit is easily accessible with a cable car starting at Brülisau, south of Appenzell. A revolving restaurant, offering panoramic views, has been built on the top.

Ascents to Hoher Kasten and the neighbouring summit Kamor were already described in the early 19th century.

See also
List of mountains of Switzerland accessible by public transport

References

External links

Cable car and panoramic restaurant (German)
Hoher Kasten on Hikr

Mountains of the Alps
Mountains of Switzerland
Buildings and structures with revolving restaurants
Mountains of Appenzell Innerrhoden
Mountains of the canton of St. Gallen
Appenzell Alps
One-thousanders of Switzerland
Appenzell Innerrhoden–St. Gallen border